WTJF-FM (94.3 FM) is a radio station broadcasting a conservative talk format. Licensed to Dyer, Tennessee, United States, the station is owned by Forever Media, through licensee Forever South Licenses, LLC.

History
On March 14, 2016, the then-WDYE changed their format from a simulcast of news/talk-formatted WTJS 1390 AM to country.

On January 16, 2017, WDYE changed their call letters to WLLI-FM and changed their format to classic country, branded as "Willie 94", joining in a simulcast of 1390 AM once more. The station changed its call sign to WZGY on December 30, 2019.

On February 3, 2020, WZGY changed their format from classic country to country, branded as "Froggy 94.3 & 99.3".

On December 30, 2020, WZGY changed its call letters to WTJF-FM and flipped to Conservative Talk, once again simulcasting 1390 AM.

Previous logo

References

External links

TJF-FM
News and talk radio stations in the United States
Gibson County, Tennessee
Radio stations established in 1995
1995 establishments in Tennessee
Conservative talk radio